The 2024 United States House of Representatives elections in Illinois will be held on November 5, 2024, to elect the seventeen U.S. representatives from the State of Illinois, one from all seventeen of the state's congressional districts. The elections will coincide with the 2024 U.S. presidential election, as well as other elections to the House of Representatives, elections to the United States Senate, and various state and local elections.

District 12

The incumbent is Republican Mike Bost, who was re-elected with 75.0% of the vote in 2022.

Republican primary

Candidates

Potential
Darren Bailey, former state senator and nominee for Governor of Illinois in 2022
Mike Bost, incumbent U.S. Representative

General election

Predictions

District 14

The 14th district includes all or parts of Aurora, DeKalb, Granville, Joliet, Montgomery, Naperville, Oswego, Ottawa, Peru, Plainfield, Shorewood, Spring Valley, Sugar Grove, and Sycamore. The incumbent is Democrat Lauren Underwood, who was re-elected with 54.2% of the vote in 2022.

Democratic primary

Candidates

Potential
Lauren Underwood, incumbent U.S. Representative

General election

Predictions

District 17

The incumbent is Democrat Eric Sorensen, who was elected with 52.0% of the vote in 2022.

Democratic primary

Candidates

Potential
Eric Sorensen, incumbent U.S. Representative

Republican primary

Candidates

Potential
Desi Anderson, business owner and nominee for Illinois's 46th State Senate district in 2022
Dan Brady, former state representative from the 105th district (2001–2023) and nominee for Illinois Secretary of State in 2022
Rafael Estrada, refugee aid nonprofit director

Declined
Neil Anderson, state senator from the 36th district (2015–present)
Esther Joy King, attorney and nominee for this district in 2020 and 2022
Tony McCombie, Minority Leader of the Illinois House of Representatives (2023–present) from the 71st district (2017–present)
Ryan Spain, state representative from the 73rd district (2017–present)

General election

Predictions

References

2024
Illinois
United States House of Representatives